Erich Koch-Weser (26 February 1875 – 19 October 1944) was a German lawyer and liberal politician. One of the founders (1918) and later chairman (1924–1930) of the liberal German Democratic Party, he served as minister of the Interior (1919–1921), vice-chancellor of Germany (1920) and minister of Justice (1928–1929).

Early life 
Erich Koch was born on 26 February 1875 in Bremerhaven as the son of Dr. Anton Koch (1838–76), a Protestant headmaster of a higher girls' school, and his wife Minna (1841–1930, née Lewenstein), the daughter of a Jewish merchant from Burhave.

Erich Koch studied law and economics at Lausanne, Bonn, Berlin and at the Ludwig Maximilian University in Munich from 1893 to 1897 where he finished with a Dr.jur.

Erich Koch was married twice. In 1903, he married Bertha (1880–1923, née Fortmann). In 1925, he married Irma (1897–1970, née von Blanquet). He had four sons and one daughters from his first marriage and two sons from his second marriage.

Political career 
In 1901, he became Mayor of Delmenhorst, in 1909 Stadtdirektor in Bremerhaven and from 1913 to 1919 was Mayor of Kassel. He belonged to the left wing of the National Liberal Party, was an admirer of Friedrich Naumann and an advocate of abolishing the Prussian Dreiklassenwahlrecht. He also served as a member of the Upper chamber of the Prussian diet.

In November 1918, Koch was a founder-member of the German Democratic Party (DDP). In January 1919, he was elected to the Weimar National Assembly for the DDP and achieved a powerful position within the party's parliamentary group.

When the DDP rejoined the government of Gustav Bauer (SPD) in October 1919, Koch became Minister of the Interior (Reichsinnenminister). He kept that office under Chancellors Hermann Müller (SPD) and Constantin Fehrenbach (Zentrum). Under Müller, Koch was also Vice-Chancellor. He left the government on 4 May 1921 and worked as an attorney in Berlin.

Koch was a member of the Reichstag from 1920 to 1930. In early 1924, Koch was elected as the successor of Carl Wilhelm Petersen as chairman of the DDP. Although a member of the DDP's right wing on many issues, in the fall of 1924, Koch refused to enter into a coalition with the nationalistic DNVP and, after the first government of Chancellor Hans Luther collapsed in 1925, tried to set up a "Grand Coalition" between DDP and SPD (it was rejected by the Social Democrats).

He changed his name to Koch-Weser (after the river Weser) in 1927, to distinguish himself from another member of parliament whose name was also Erich Koch.

In 1928, Koch-Weser became Minister of Justice in the new government of Hermann Müller. He attempted a fundamental reform of criminal law, but as the Zentrum demanded the Justice department, Koch-Weser lost his position in April 1929.

In the summer of 1930, Koch-Weser merged the DDP with Artur Mahraun's Young German Order into the Deutsche Staatspartei, trying to gather what remained of the pro-republican, Protestant middle-class in a single political party. After the poor performance of his new party in the September 1930 election, Koch-Weser resigned from the Reichstag and from the leadership of the party.

Later life 
Koch-Weser then left politics and worked as a lawyer in Berlin. After the Nazis seized power, they banned him from practicing law in the fall of 1933. He emigrated to Brazil where he bought a large coffee plantation called Fazenda Janeta near Rolândia in the state of Paraná. Koch-Weser died at Fazenda Janeta on 19 (or 20) October 1944.

Erich Koch-Weser was the grandfather of former World Bank executive and German politician Caio Koch-Weser. He became the first ever honorary citizen of Delmenhorst in 1928.

References

Bibliography 

 Die Umgestaltung der beiden Häuser des Landtags, 1918
 Einheitsstaat und Selbstverwaltung, 1928
 Deutschlands Außenpolitik in der Nachkriegszeit 1919–29, 1929 (Engl.: Germany in the Post-War World, 1930)
 Und dennoch aufwärts!, 1933
 Hitler and beyond, A German Testament, 1945.

External links
 

1875 births
1944 deaths
People from Bremerhaven
German Protestants
German people of Jewish descent
German Democratic Party politicians
German State Party politicians
Vice-Chancellors of Germany
Government ministers of Germany
Members of the Weimar National Assembly
Members of the Reichstag of the Weimar Republic
Members of the Prussian House of Lords
Reichsbanner Schwarz-Rot-Gold members